Fernando Wilson dos Santos (died November 1991) served as the representative of the National Union for the Total Independence of Angola (UNITA), a rebel group in Angola, to Portugal. His brother-in-law, Tito Chingunji, served as Foreign Secretary of UNITA, the principal rebel group that fought against the dos Santos government in Angola's civil war.

Death and investigation
Wilson dos Santos was murdered in November 1991 by unknown persons. In the 1990s, UNITA Foreign Minister Tony da Costa Fernandes and UNITA Interior Minister General Miguel N'Zau Puna allegedly uncovered the fact that Jonas Savimbi ordered the assassinations of both dos Santos and Chingunji. Dos Santos and Chingunji's deaths and the defections of Fernandes and Puna weakened the UNITA's relationship with the United States and harmed Savimbi's international reputation. Savimbi denied the allegations.

See also
List of unsolved murders

References

1990s murders in Angola
1991 crimes in Angola
1991 deaths
1991 murders in Africa
20th-century Angolan people
Angolan anti-communists
Angolan rebels
Angolan revolutionaries
Angolan warlords
Assassinated Angolan politicians
Members of UNITA
People of the Angolan Civil War
UNITA politicians
Unsolved murders in Angola
Year of birth missing